Huang Mingda was a Chinese diplomat. He was born in Nanhai, Guangdong. He was Ambassador of the People's Republic of China to Sri Lanka (1973–1977), Afghanistan (1977–1979) and Myanmar (1982–1985).
From 1965 to 1966 he was Counsellor of the Embassy in Burma.
From 1970 to 1971 he was Chargé d'affaires of the Chinese Ambassador to India.

References

Ambassadors of China to Sri Lanka
Ambassadors of China to the Maldives
Ambassadors of China to Afghanistan
Ambassadors of China to Myanmar
People from Nanhai District